The Independent School League or ISL is a group of seventeen preparatory schools located in the Washington metropolitan area of the United States  that compete with each other athletically. All competitors in the ISL are girls, but not all schools are "all-girls" schools. The league is broken into two divisions: A and AA.  The schools which compete in each division vary by sport.

Member schools

References

 
High school sports conferences and leagues in the United States